Ludvík Klíma (27 June 1912 - 19 May 1973) was a Czechoslovak sprint canoeist who competed in the late 1930s and late 1940s. He won a bronze medal in the K-4 1000 m event at the 1948 ICF Canoe Sprint World Championships in London.

Klíma also competed in two Summer Olympics, earning his best finish of fifth in the folding K-2 10000 m event at Berlin in 1936. He was born and died in Prague.

References

Sports-reference.com profile

1912 births
1973 deaths
Canoeists at the 1936 Summer Olympics
Canoeists at the 1948 Summer Olympics
Czech male canoeists
Czechoslovak male canoeists
Olympic canoeists of Czechoslovakia
ICF Canoe Sprint World Championships medalists in kayak
Canoeists from Prague